San Ysidro is a census-designated place in Doña Ana County, New Mexico. Its population was 2,090 as of the 2010 census.

Geography

Education
It is served by the Las Cruces Public Schools.

References

Census-designated places in New Mexico
Census-designated places in Doña Ana County, New Mexico